Lewis Horner (born 1 February 1992) is a professional footballer who plays as a midfielder. Horner has previously played for Hibernian, and a loan spell at East Stirlingshire. He has also played for Inverness Caledonian Thistle, Newcastle Benfield and he has had two spells at Blyth Spartans.

Career

Horner attended Seaton Burn School and joined the football development programme at Tyne Met College. His progression at college went so well that he won a scholarship with Hibernian. Horner signed his first professional contract with Hibernian in January 2010 and made his first team debut as a substitute against Inverness CT on 11 May 2011.

He was loaned to Scottish Third Division side East Stirlingshire in November 2011 and made his debut the following day against Berwick Rangers.

Horner was released by Hibernian at the end of his contract in 2013 and he signed for English non-league club Newcastle Benfield. He then moved to Blyth Spartans in September 2013, having played against them during pre-season. At Blyth, Horner earned a call up to the 'England C' squad, from manager Paul Fairclough, for a fixture marking the Northern League's 125th anniversary.

After a successful trial in August 2014, Horner signed professional terms with Inverness Caledonian Thistle, reuniting him with manager John Hughes, who had previously been his manager at Hibernian. He made his debut for the club, coming on as a substitute for David Raven in the 82nd minutes, in a 0–0 draw against Dundee. Horner was an unused substitute as Inverness won the 2015 Scottish Cup Final.

In May 2017, the Scottish Football Association imposed a suspended eight-match ban on Horner for betting on football.

After Horner was released by Inverness in 2017, he signed again for Blyth Spartans. Despite an impressive few months back at Blyth, Horner fell out of favour with Manager Alun Armstrong and failed to reestablish himself in the team. On 4 May 2020, Horner left Blyth Spartans.

Career statistics

References

1992 births
Association football midfielders
Blyth Spartans A.F.C. players
East Stirlingshire F.C. players
English footballers
Hibernian F.C. players
Living people
Newcastle Benfield F.C. players
Scottish Football League players
Scottish Premier League players
Footballers from Newcastle upon Tyne
Inverness Caledonian Thistle F.C. players
Scottish Professional Football League players